HMS Gorgon and her sister ship  were two monitors originally built as coastal defence ships for the Royal Norwegian Navy, as HNoMS Nidaros and  respectively, by Armstrong Whitworth at Elswick. She was purchased from Norway at the beginning of the First World War, but was not completed until 1918 although she had been launched over three years earlier. She engaged targets in Occupied Flanders for the last several months of the war and fired the last shots of the war against such targets on 15 October 1918. She was used as a target ship after several attempts to sell her had fallen through before being sold for scrap in 1928.

Background
Nidaros was ordered by Norway in 1913 to supplement the older  and  classes of coastal defense ships. She would have been known in Norway as P/S Nidaros; P/S stands for Panserskip ("armoured ship"), while Nidaros was the old name for the Norwegian city of Trondheim. However, when the First World War broke out, the Royal Navy requisitioned most warships under construction in Britain for foreign powers and refunded the two-thirds of the Bjørgvins £370,000 purchase price already paid by the Norwegians.

Construction and description
Nidaros was laid down by Armstrong Whitworth at Elswick on 11 June 1913 and launched on 9 June 1914. She was renamed as Gorgon, after an earlier breastwork monitor of 1871. Her completion was greatly delayed by the modifications made by the British, which included modifying the boilers to use both oil and coal and conversion of 12 double-bottom tanks to carry oil. This work began on 9 January 1915, but was suspended the following May, when it was estimated that only another 10–12 months of work remained, to allow for faster progress to be made on the large light cruisers  and  that were building in Armstrong's Naval Yard downriver. Addition of the bulges cost  in speed, but prevented the extra weight resulting from all of these changes from deepening her draft. She was finally completed on 4 June 1918.

She was armed with two 9.2-inch guns arranged in two single-gun turrets, one turret each fore and aft. Her secondary armament consisted of four six-inch guns, also in single gun turrets, two of which superfired over the 9.2-inch turrets and the others were positioned on each side of the superstructure. One  anti-aircraft gun was mounted on each center-line six-inch turret. She also carried four 3-pounder and four 2-pounder guns on high-angle mounts.

Service
Gorgon arrived at Dover on 6 June 1918 where she spent the next five weeks working up. Three days later, she accompanied  on a bombardment of Batterie "Tirpitz". She spent the next month and a half either out on patrol in the English Channel or preparing for the bombardment scheduled for the end of September in support of a major offensive along the coast.

Conditions were not good as both wind and tide were against her. Gorgons stern anchor cable parted and she swung around on her bow anchor so that only her rear turret could bear on the target. No aircraft were made available to spot for her so there was little chance of a hit and she only fired eleven rounds. She, and the other monitors, were attacked several times during the day by German aircraft with little effect and several coast defense batteries attempted to engage them through the smokescreen put up by the motor launches supporting the operation. She fired thirteen shells the next day in another attempt to destroy the bridge and claimed one hit although this was not confirmed by subsequent observations.

On 14 October, she repeated the experience, except that her target was now the Middelkerke batteries. The fire of the Tirpitz and Raversyde Batteries soon disabused them of any notions to the contrary and Gorgon was forced to turn away at maximum speed, which was faster than she'd made on trials, when they straddled her and hit her with splinters from the near-misses. The following day she returned to her original target and fired 30 rounds in 20 minutes. These were the last shots of the war fired against German batteries on the Belgian coast.

She was sent to Portsmouth after the end of the war where she was made available to investigate the cause of her sister ship Glattons magazine explosion. She was moved to Devonport as a temporary tender to the stone frigate Vivid in April 1919. She was paid off on 31 August and joined the Reserve Fleet in September. She was offered back to the Norwegians, but they rejected her as unsuitable to their requirements, especially since she was now too broad for their dock at Horten. Several attempts were made to sell her, but she was disarmed in 1922 and used as a target ship to evaluate the effects of bombs bursting underwater near a ship and the effects of six-inch gunfire. She was finally sold for scrap on 26 August 1928 and broken up at the former naval dockyard at Pembroke.

Notes

References

External links

 

Bjørgvin-class coastal defence ships
Gorgon-class monitors
Ships built on the River Tyne
1914 ships
World War I monitors of the United Kingdom
Ships built by Armstrong Whitworth